Wuyi Square is located in Gulou District, Fuzhou, Fujian, China. North of the square is the Nine Immortals' Hill (Yu Hill).

The square covers an area of 70,000 square meters. This one of the political activities place for Fuzhou people.

Squares in Fuzhou